Loh may refer to:

People
 Betty Loh Ti (1937–1968), Chinese actress
 Christine Loh Kung-wai, Hong Kong university professor
 John M. Loh (born 1938), USAF Chief of Staff
 Loh Boon Siew (1915–1995), Penangite businessman
 Loh (Ramayana) in Hindu mythology
 Valerie Solanas, aka Onz Loh,  U.S. writer
 Sandra Tsing Loh (born 1962), US writer
 Loh Kean Yew, Singaporean badminton player

Places

 A locality of Affoltern am Albis, Zürich, Switzerland
 A misspelling of Lo Island, Vanuatu

Others

 Loh Kooi Choon v Malaysia (1977), a legal case about the constitution
 A variant spelling of the Chinese surname, Lu  

LOH may refer to:
Loss of heterozygosity in genetics
Light Observation Helicopter,  US
 HAL Light Observation Helicopter
 Lostock Hall railway station, England, National Rail code
 Ciudad de Catamayo Airport, Loja, Ecuador, IATA code
Late-onset hypogonadism, a medical condition